Ben Maddow (born David Wolff, August 7, 1909 in Passaic, New Jersey – October 9, 1992 in Los Angeles, California) was an American screenwriter and documentarian from the 1930s through the 1970s. Educated at Columbia University, Maddow began his career working within the American documentary movement in the 1930s.

In 1936 he co-founded the short-lived left-wing newsreel The World Today. Under the pseudonym of David Wolff, Maddow co-wrote the screenplay to the Paul Strand–Leo Hurwitz documentary landmark, Native Land (1942).

He earned his first feature screenplay credit with Framed (1947). Other screenplays include Clarence Brown's Intruder in the Dust (1949, an adaptation of the William Faulkner novel), John Huston's The Asphalt Jungle (1950, for which he received an Academy Award nomination), Johnny Guitar (1954, credited to Philip Yordan who wrote it on location), God's Little Acre (1958, an adaptation of the Erskine Caldwell novel, originally credited to Philip Yordan as a HUAC-era "front" for Maddow, and with title card restored to Maddow, only, during the UCLA Film and Television Archive restoration), and, again with Huston, an Edgar Award for Best Mystery Screenplay) and The Unforgiven (1960).

As a documentarian he directed and wrote such films as Storm of Strangers, The Stairs, and The Savage Eye (1959), which won the BAFTA Flaherty Documentary Award. Maddow made his solo feature directorial debut with the striking, offbeat feature An Affair of the Skin (1963), a well-acted story of several loves and friendships gone sour and marked by the rich characterisations which had distinguished his best screenplays.

In 1961, Maddow and Huston co-wrote the episode "The Professor" of the 1961 television series The Asphalt Jungle. In 1968 he wrote a screenplay based on Edmund Naughton's novel McCabe; while a film adaptation of the novel was ultimately produced as McCabe & Mrs. Miller (1971), Maddow wasn't credited on the film. His final screenplay was for the horror melodrama The Mephisto Waltz (1970).

References
Notes

Bibliography

Further reading
 Recent essay on Maddow, including a discussion of the effects of his blacklisting and of the possibility that he "named names" in 1958.
Hagan, John (2000). " Ben Maddow", in Tom Pendergast and Sara Pendergast (editors), International Dictionary of Film and Filmmakers, Edition 4 (St. James Press), . Online version of article retrieved January 9, 2008.
Haut, Woody (2008). "Ben Maddow: Affairs of the Skin," blog posted by a film critic who has published several books. Archived by WebCite from the original 2008-02-26.

External links

1909 births
1992 deaths
American male screenwriters
Edgar Award winners
Columbia University alumni
20th-century American male writers
20th-century American screenwriters